The Girl on the Train is a 2016 American mystery psychological thriller film directed by Tate Taylor and written by Erin Cressida Wilson, based on British author Paula Hawkins' popular 2015 debut novel of the same name. The film stars Emily Blunt, Rebecca Ferguson, Haley Bennett, Justin Theroux, Luke Evans, Allison Janney, Édgar Ramírez, and Lisa Kudrow. The film follows an alcoholic divorcée who becomes involved in a missing person investigation.

Principal photography began on November 4, 2015, in New York City. Produced by Marc Platt and DreamWorks Pictures, The Girl on the Train was the first film to be distributed by Universal Pictures as part of DreamWorks' new distribution deal via the company Amblin Partners.

The Girl on the Train premiered in London on September 20, 2016, before it was theatrically released in the United States on October 7, 2016. The film was a box office success, grossing  worldwide. It received mixed reviews, but Blunt's performance received critical acclaim, as well as nominations for Outstanding Performance by a Female Actor in a Leading Role at the 23rd Screen Actors Guild Awards and the BAFTA Award for Best Actress in a Leading Role at the 70th British Academy Film Awards. A Hindi-language remake of the same name was released in 2021, with Bollywood actress Parineeti Chopra in the starring role.

Plot
Rachel Watson is a recovering alcoholic who aimlessly rides a train into New York City every day after losing her job and her marriage. From the train, she fixates on the lives of her ex-husband Tom, his new wife Anna, and their neighbors, Scott and Megan Hipwell; Megan worked for Tom and Anna as a nanny for their baby, Evie, but had recently quit.

During her marriage to Tom, Rachel became depressed about her infertility and developed a drinking problem which led to continual blackouts and destructive behavior. At a barbecue held by Tom's boss, she drunkenly made a scene and Tom was later fired because of it. Now, while intoxicated, Rachel often harasses Tom and Anna, calling them repeatedly throughout the day, though she has little memory of this once she sobers up.

On the way home one afternoon, Rachel becomes infuriated when she spots Megan kissing a stranger. She goes to confront Megan but awakens in her own bed hours later, covered in blood. Megan is reported missing and Rachel is questioned by Detective Riley because she was seen in the vicinity that day. Rachel contacts Scott, posing as Megan's friend, to tell him about the affair. He shows her a picture of Dr. Kamal Abdic, Megan's psychiatrist, whom Rachel identifies as the man she saw kissing Megan. As a result, Abdic is questioned as a suspect but tells the police that Scott was emotionally abusive toward Megan, and suspicion shifts to him.

Believing Abdic is involved in Megan's disappearance, Rachel schedules an appointment with him, but she winds up discussing her own emotional issues. Abdic recalls a session with Megan in which she revealed she had a baby when she was very young. The baby accidentally drowned in the bathtub and Megan never forgave herself for it. Megan is found dead and tests reveal she was pregnant, but neither Scott nor Abdic was the father. Scott enters Rachel's house and aggressively confronts her for lying to him about knowing Megan, directing the police toward Abdic, and leaving him as the new prime suspect. Rachel tries to report the assault to the police, believing Scott's violence suggests he may have murdered Megan, but Riley says that he has been ruled out as a suspect as there is CCTV footage of him at a bar at the time.

On the train, Rachel sees Martha, the wife of Tom's former boss, and apologizes for her behavior at the barbecue where she believes she broke a platter, threw food, and insulted Martha; the latter says she did nothing wrong, and it is revealed that Tom had been fired for having sex with co-workers. Rachel realizes that Tom planted false memories in her head during her drinking binges, and was also physically violent with her during her blackouts, which accounts for the injuries she had when she awoke. Meanwhile, Anna suspects Tom of cheating and secretly finds a cell phone hidden in their house; the voicemail greeting reveals that the phone belonged to Megan.

A now sober Rachel remembers that on the day of Megan's disappearance, she caught Megan meeting Tom, and he hit her when she tried to confront them. Realizing Tom killed Megan when she refused to abort his baby, Rachel warns Anna, who is already aware. When both women confront Tom, he becomes angry, tries to force Rachel to drink alcohol again, throws the drink at her face, and then knocks her unconscious. When Rachel awakens, she flees for the front door but it is locked. Tom tries to strangle her as Anna watches from the top of the stairs, guarding Evie. Rachel doubles back through the kitchen and picks up a corkscrew. Outside, Tom grabs her and—as she turns—she stabs him in the neck with the corkscrew. Anna then appears and twists it deeper into Tom's neck, killing him and avenging Megan's death. Interviewed by Riley, Rachel and Anna tell identical stories about killing Tom in self-defense after he admitted that he was Megan's killer. Anna admits that Rachel had been right about everything.

Later, Rachel visits Megan's tombstone at a cemetery and states: "We are tied forever now, the three of us, bound forever by the story we shared." Later, she sits on the opposite side of the train, hopeful for a new life.

Cast
 Emily Blunt as Rachel Watson, a lonely and alcoholic divorcée
 Rebecca Ferguson as Anna Watson, a real-estate agent and Tom's wife
 Haley Bennett as Megan Hipwell, Anna and Tom's nanny
 Justin Theroux as Tom Watson, Rachel's ex-husband and Anna's current husband
 Luke Evans as Scott Hipwell, Megan's husband
 Allison Janney as DS. Riley, a detective
 Édgar Ramírez as Dr. Kamal Abdic, Megan's psychiatrist
 Lisa Kudrow as Martha, the wife of Tom's former boss
 Laura Prepon as Cathy, Rachel's college friend, roommate, and landlord
 Darren Goldstein as "Man in the Suit", a stranger who witnesses Rachel's behavior

Production

Development
DreamWorks Pictures acquired the film rights to Hawkins' novel and the film was planned for production by Marc E. Platt (through Marc Platt Productions) in March 2014. In early 2015, Erin Cressida Wilson was hired to write the script and Tate Taylor was hired to direct the film. Hawkins told The Sunday Times that the film's setting would be moved from London to Westchester, New York.

Casting
In June 2015, Emily Blunt was offered the title role of the lonely and alcoholic divorcée Rachel. The studio had eyed Kate Mara for another of the three lead roles. In August, Rebecca Ferguson was confirmed to play Anna and Haley Bennett was added to the cast to play the third female lead role, Megan.

Jared Leto and Chris Evans were in talks to join the film, where Evans would play Tom, Rachel's ex-husband, and Leto would play the neighbor's husband. However, Justin Theroux replaced Evans and Luke Evans replaced Leto, who both left the film due to scheduling issues. In October, Édgar Ramírez joined the film to play Dr. Kamal Abdic, who is having an affair with the married Megan, and becomes a suspect in her disappearance. Allison Janney also joined the cast to play a police detective. The next month, Lisa Kudrow was cast as Martha, the wife of Tom's former boss. Laura Prepon joined the cast as Cathy, the landlord, roommate, and college friend of Rachel Watson.

Filming

Principal photography on the film began on November 4, 2015, in New York City. In late November 2015, filming also took place in White Plains, as well as in Hastings-on-Hudson and Irvington, New York. Filming wrapped up on January 30, 2016.

Post-production
During post-production on the film, a cameo appearance by Paula Hawkins was cut from the film.

Release
The film was part of DreamWorks' distribution deal with Walt Disney Studios, which began in 2009. In November 2015, Walt Disney Studios Motion Pictures scheduled the film for an October 7, 2016, release through their Touchstone Pictures banner. However, DreamWorks and Disney did not renew their distribution deal, and in December 2015, Universal Pictures acquired the film's distribution rights, as part of their new distribution deal with DreamWorks' parent company, Amblin Partners.

Universal retained Disney's original release date. Universal also distributed overseas, except in Europe, the Middle East and Africa, where distribution was handled by Mister Smith Entertainment through other distributors. Entertainment One released the film in the United Kingdom on October 5, 2016.

Reception

Box office
The Girl on the Train grossed $75.4 million in the United States and Canada and $97.8 million in other countries for a worldwide total of $173.2 million, against a production budget of $45 million.

In the United States and Canada, the film was released alongside The Birth of a Nation and Middle School: The Worst Years of My Life, and was projected to gross around $25–30 million in its opening weekend, with some having it opening to as low as $18 million. The film was expected to play like the similarly themed Gone Girl, which opened to $37.5 million in October 2014, although that film had more star power to carry it. It went on to gross $24.5 million in its opening weekend, finishing first at the box office. In its second weekend it grossed $12 million, finishing third at the box office.

Critical response
On review aggregator Rotten Tomatoes, The Girl on the Train has an approval rating of 44% based on 307 reviews, with an average rating of 5.30/10. The website's critical consensus reads, "Emily Blunt's outstanding performance isn't enough to keep The Girl on the Train from sliding sluggishly into exploitative melodrama." On Metacritic, the film has a weighted average score of 48 out of 100, based on 49 critics, indicating "mixed or average reviews". Audiences polled by CinemaScore gave the film a grade of "B−" on an A+ to F scale.

IGN critic Terri Schwartz gave the film a score of 5.5/10, writing: "The Girl on the Train has a talented cast, but ultimately squanders it for the sake of a hollow, ponderous plot. Alternately overly convoluted and predictable, the film relies too heavily on its twists while offering little in the way of character development, leaving its three central women as unrelatable and unlikable stereotypes." Rolling Stones Peter Travers gave the film a positive review, commenting that: "[T]he movie gives away the game faster than the novel, but Emily Blunt digs so deep into the role of a blackout drunk and maybe murderer that she raises Girl to the level of spellbinder."

Chicago Sun-Times Richard Roeper gave 2 stars out 4, and said that the film is "shiny trash that begins with promise but quickly gets tripped up by its own screenplay and grows increasingly ludicrous and melodramatic, to the point where I was barely able to suppress a chuckle at some of the final scenes". Christy Lemire of RogerEbert.com gave  stars out of 4, and described the film as, "a flat and suspense-free tale of pretty people in peril".

Accolades

See also
 George Tooker, "The Subway", (painting, 1950), at the Whitney Museum of American Art.
  Untermyer Fountain, Central Park, New York City

References

External links

 
 
 
 Official screenplay

2016 films
2016 psychological thriller films
2016 thriller drama films
2010s mystery drama films
2010s mystery thriller films
2010s pregnancy films
Adultery in films
American mystery drama films
American mystery thriller films
American nonlinear narrative films
American pregnancy films
American psychological thriller films
American thriller drama films
DreamWorks Pictures films
2010s English-language films
Fiction with unreliable narrators
Films about alcoholism
Films about dysfunctional families
Films about grieving
Films about missing people
Films about murder
Films based on British novels
Films based on crime novels
Films based on thriller novels
Films directed by Tate Taylor
Films produced by Marc E. Platt
Films scored by Danny Elfman
Films set in New York City
Films set on trains
Films shot in New York City
Reliance Entertainment films
Universal Pictures films
2010s American films